The women's figure skating free program in roller sports at the 2015 Pan American Games was held between July 11–12 at the Direct Energy Centre (Exhibition Centre), in Toronto. Due to naming rights the venue will be known as the latter for the duration of the games. The defending Pan American Games champion is Elizabeth Soler of Argentina.

Schedule
All times are Central Standard Time (UTC-6).

Results
8 athletes from 8 countries competed.

References

Roller sports at the 2015 Pan American Games